The Lázaro Barrera Stakes is a Listed American Thoroughbred horse race for horses age three years old run over a distance of  furlongs on the dirt track held annually in June at Santa Anita Park in Arcadia, California.

History
The event is named in honor of United States Triple Crown and Hall of Fame trainer Lázaro "Laz" Barrera.

The inaugural running of the event is debatable since there are two paths that converge to the realization of the current event.
The Los Angeles Turf Club, which holds the event at Santa Anita, believe that the current Lázaro Barrera Stakes has its beginnings via the Playa Del Rey Stakes, which had its first running in 1953 at Hollywood Park Racetrack in Inglewood, California. This event was set for Californian bred three year old fillies at a distance of 7 furlongs. The event was run one more time and then went idle until 1995.

The other path merits consideration. With regard to the first running of the Affirmed Handicap in 1981, the event was named after the 1978 United States Triple Crown Champion Affirmed who was trained by Lázaro Barrera. This event was held in the fall and was changed in 1991 by the Hollywood Turf Club to the Lazaro S. Barrera Handicap four years before the renewal of the Playa Del Rey Stakes in 1995, the implied predecessor to the current event.

In 1999 the Hollywood Turf Club scheduled the Lazaro Barrera Memorial Stakes in late May at the current distance of 7 furlongs.

The event was upgraded to a Grade II event in 2002, and was downgraded to Grade III in 2007.
In 2013 the event was run as the Listed Came Home Stakes.
In 2022 the event was downgraded to Listed.

Records
Speed record: 
 7 furlongs: 1:20.42 - Early Flyer (2001)
  miles: 1:40.83 - Goldigger's Dream  (1993)

Margins: 
 6 lengths – Sea Cadet (1991)

Most wins by a trainer:
 4 - Ron McAnally (1991, 1996, 1997, 2001)

Most wins by a jockey:
 5 - Chris McCarron (1982, 1983, 1984, 1985, 2001)

Most wins by an owner:
 3 - VHW Stables (1991, 1996, 2001)

Winners

Lazaro Barrera Stakes

Lazaro S. Barrera Handicap 

Legend:

 
 

Notes:

† Filly or Mare

See also
 List of American and Canadian Graded races

References

Horse races in California
Santa Anita Park
Flat horse races for three-year-olds
Graded stakes races in the United States
Recurring sporting events established in 1953
1953 establishments in California